Wilfredo Manuel Bacian Delgado (born 1976) is a Chilean cultural manager who was elected as a member of the Chilean Constitutional Convention.

References

External links
 

1976 births
Living people
21st-century Chilean politicians
Members of the Chilean Constitutional Convention
Arturo Prat University alumni
21st-century Chilean women politicians